The Innocence Mission is an American indie folk band formed in Lancaster, Pennsylvania in 1986. The band is composed of Karen Peris (née McCullough), her husband (and fellow guitarist) Don Peris, and Mike Bitts (on bass guitar). Although all members of the band have contributed to their music, Karen Peris is their main writer.

History
The band members met in 1980 during a Catholic school production of Godspell. Before being signed to a record label, the band was originally called Masquerade and played covers at local clubs, events and at Lancaster Catholic High School (the alma mater of the band members). By 1986, the band had changed its name to The Innocence Mission and began to write original music. They released a self-funded EP titled Tending the Rose Garden in 1986, of which only 1,000 copies were produced. The song "Shadows" from the EP was recorded by Amy Grant on her 1988 album Lead Me On.

Their self-titled debut album was released in 1989 on A&M Records and was produced by Larry Klein, then-husband of Joni Mitchell. Recorded in Mitchell's Los Angeles studio, the album spent 10 weeks on the Billboard charts, peaking at #167 in 1990.  Klein also produced their 1991 follow up, Umbrella.Their third A&M album, Glow (1995), was produced by Dennis Herring, who had previously produced two records for Camper Van Beethoven. This album is a departure from Klein's heavier production style. Herring's lighter touch gave more emphasis to the group's guitar work and to Karen's vocals and lyrics. Glow contains songs that appear on the soundtracks of the films Empire Records and Dream for an Insomniac, as well as the television series Party of Five. The album's second track, "Bright as Yellow," peaked at #33 on Billboard’s Modern Rock Tracks. After the band completed the recording of a follow-up album to Glow, A&M Records was bought by Universal Music Group. The group decided to mutually part ways with the label, shortly before it was merged with other companies to form Interscope-Geffen-A&M.

1999's Birds of My Neighborhood inaugurated The Innocence Mission as they are today, following three albums as a quartet that drew comparisons to The Sundays and 10,000 Maniacs. When drummer Steve Brown left, Karen Peris (guitars, piano, pump organ, accordion, voice), Don Peris (guitars, drums, voice) and Mike Bitts (upright bass) forged ahead with an orchestral and sometimes cinematic folk-pop sound, a sound rich in atmosphere, innately sad, but ultimately hopeful. The album was followed by the release of The Lakes of Canada EP, which contains a remix of "Snow" by Icelandic electronic group GusGus, the band's only remix thus far.

The 2000 release, Christ Is My Hope, featuring folk songs and hymns that had inspired them over the years, was independently distributed by their own label, LAMP, with all proceeds from sales of the record being donated to hunger relief charities. An exclusive one-album deal signed with independent label WhatAreRecords? saw Small Planes following a year later.

Their first album on Badman Records in the US and Agenda in Europe, Befriended, was released in 2003 and was followed a year later by a collection of lullabies, standards, traditional and classical songs called Now the Day Is Over. Recorded over two weeks in August 2004, the album contained their well-known cover of Henry Mancini's "Moon River." Badman Records acquired license to re-master and re-issue the then-out-of-print Birds of My Neighborhood album in 2006.  The label re-issued Now the Day is Over in 2022 with new artwork.We Walked in Song was released in 2007 and included the song "Brotherhood of Man", which appeared in two acclaimed films: the documentary The Human Experience and the short film Weathered, starring Tony Hale and Nicole Parker, which also featured a new version of the song "Our Harry". Also on this album are "Happy Birthday" and closing song "Over the Moon", both of which are featured in the Julia Roberts film Fireflies in the Garden.

On June 6, 2008, "Bright as Yellow" was played as the official NASA wake-up call for the crew of Space Shuttle mission STS-124 on flight day 7.Street Map was released in December 2008 and was the second record to be distributed independently on their own LAMP label, while their eighth studio album, My Room in the Trees, was released on July 13, 2010. Their ninth studio album, Hello I Feel the Same, was released on October 17, 2015, followed by Sun on the Square in 2018. Their next studio album, See You Tomorrow, was released on January 17, 2020.

Don Peris has recorded four solo albums: Ten Silver Slide Trombones (2001), the mostly instrumental Go When the Morning Shineth (2006), which features a vocal contribution from Karen Peris on "North Atlantic Sand", and an instrumental solo guitar album, Brighter Visions Beam Afar (2007), which raised money for local food banks. His fourth studio album, The Old Century, was released on May 7, 2013. Karen Peris released her first solo album, Violet, on December 3, 2012. The ten-song album was performed mainly on piano, and features six instrumental compositions. Don Peris appears as guitarist on two songs, while the couple's two children performed violin and viola on a further two songs. A version of the album containing two bonus tracks, "First Days in the City" and "Getting Here", was released in Japan through P-Vine Records on May 15, 2013. Karen's second solo album, A Song Is Way Above the Lawn, was released on October 8, 2021.

Sufjan Stevens calls The Innocence Mission "moving and profound", adding, “What makes Karen Peris’ lyrics so remarkable is the economy of words, sensory language, concrete nouns – everyday objects take on tremendous meaning.”

Discography

 The Innocence Mission (1989)
 Umbrella (1991)
 Glow (1995)
 Christ Is My Hope (2000)
 Birds of My Neighborhood (1999)
 Small Planes (2001)
 Befriended (2003)
 Now the Day is Over (2004)
 We Walked in Song (2007)
 My Room in the Trees (2010)
 Hello I Feel the Same (2015)
 Sun on the Square (2018)
 See You Tomorrow (2020)

Film and television
 2018 - Irreplaceable You - song: "Tomorrow on the Runway" 
 2012 - The Perks of Being a Wallflower - song: "Evensong"
 2011 - Fireflies in the Garden - songs: "Over the Moon" and "Happy Birthday"
 2011 - Grey’s Anatomy - song: "Rain (Setting out in the Leaf Boat)"
 2011 - Alive and Ticking - song: "Tomorrow on the Runway"
 2009 - Weathered - songs: "Brotherhood of Man" and "Our Harry"
 2008 - The Human Experience - songs: "Brotherhood of Man" and "Moon River"
 1996 - Dream for an Insomniac - song: "Keeping Awake"
 1996 - Party of Five - song: "Everything's Different Now"
 1995 - Empire Records - song: "Bright as Yellow"
 1990 - Beverly Hills 90210 «Pilot / Class Of Beverly Hills, Parts 1 & 2» - song "Clear to you"

Guest recordings
 2021 - Lost Horizons, In Quiet Moments - Karen
 2017 - Lost Horizons, Ojalá - Karen
 2005 - Denison Witmer, Are You a Dreamer? - Don and Karen, produced and engineered by Don
 1998 - Natalie Merchant, Ophelia - Karen and Don
 1991 - Joni Mitchell, Night Ride Home - Karen
 1990 - John Hiatt, Stolen Moments - Karen

References

External links
Official website for the innocence mission
Official website for Don Peris.
Badman Recording Co.
KORDA Records
The Innocence Mission Discography 4.0 A discography, news and fan site.

Musical groups from Pennsylvania
Culture of Lancaster, Pennsylvania
Indie Recordings albums
American indie folk groups
A&M Records artists
RCA Records artists